The 48th Golden Bell Awards (Mandarin:第48屆金鐘獎) was held on October 25, 2013 at Sun Yat-sen Memorial Hall in Taipei, Taiwan. The ceremony was broadcast live by CTV.

Winners and nominees
Below is the list of winners and nominees for the main categories.

References

External links
 Official website of the 48th Golden Bell Awards

2013
2013 television awards
2013 in Taiwan